Boone Township is one of fourteen townships in Madison County, Indiana, United States. As of the 2010 census, its population was 661 and it contained 270 housing units.

It was named for Daniel Boone.

Geography

Cemeteries
The township contains these two cemeteries: Carver and Forrestville.

Major highways
  Indiana State Road 9
  Indiana State Road 37

Education
 Madison-Grant United School Corporation

Boone Township residents may obtain a free library card from the North Madison County Public Library System with branches in Elwood, Frankton, and Summitville.

Political districts
 Indiana's 6th congressional district
 State House District 35
 State Senate District 20

References
 
 United States Census Bureau 2008 TIGER/Line Shapefiles
 IndianaMap

External links
 Indiana Township Association
 United Township Association of Indiana
 City-Data.com page for Boone Township
 Boone Township History

Townships in Madison County, Indiana
Townships in Indiana